Pornóapáti (until 1899: Pornó;) is a village in Vas County, Hungary, situated on the river Pinka and Hungary's border with Austria.

The village is sometimes said to have been founded in 1691. The attribution cannot be correct. Nothing happened in that year to warrant it. The date is most likely taken from an Urbarium (land registry) executed between the Society of Jesus and the tenants in that year. (The present whereabouts of the document, if extant, are unknown.) 

The oldest known written record is the charter by which the Cistercian Order was granted land, dated 1233. In the grant of Perwolf to Schützen, dated 1221, it is mentioned as an adjoiner. (It evidently pre-existed that grant and is more than 800 years old.)

The German name "Bernau" probably dates to 828, when Louis the German divided the Ostmark into counties and renamed the county seat in which it is located, the Roman city of Savaria, Stein am Anger.

The oldest known evidence of ownership of the land is a memorial stone found at the Meierhof in 1930, dating to the early 4th century. It was prepared by a retired legionnaire and his wife for their daughter. (The stone has mysteriously disappeared.)

During the summer and autumn of 1989, Pornóapáti was a popular transit point for refugees fleeing the socialist Central European countries, especially East Germany.  Its location, far from official border crossing stations and surrounded on three sides by Austria made it a practical pedestrian escape route.  Many automobiles were abandoned in the woods to the northeast.

It has been a popular tourism attraction for urban travellers since it contains "Porno" in its name. In addition, the word "Apáti" means "Abbey's", referring to a Cistercian Abbey found there. This gives the name of the village "Porno abbey's" meaning. The pronunciation of the title is quite homonym to an expression "porno party" as well.

References

External links 
 http://www.pornoapati.hu/

Populated places in Vas County